These species of tree frogs in the family Hylidae are commonly referred to as the Arizona tree frog:

Canyon tree frog (Hyla arenicolor)
Mountain tree frog (Hyla eximia), listed as the official Arizona state amphibian, but as currently circumscribed does not occur in Arizona
Arizona tree frog (Hyla wrightorum), previously considered a synonym of Hyla eximia, present in Arizona

Symbols of Arizona